Gangtai are the C-pop artists and musical style from Hong Kong or Taiwan. The term is synonymous with post-1960 Cantopop or post-1970 Mandopop, a sweet, love type melody found distinctly in C-pop and not any other genre of Chinese folk, rock or traditional music.

See also
 Shidaiqu

References

Chinese styles of music
Cantopop
C-pop
Culture of Hong Kong
Taiwanese culture
Chinese words and phrases